Quzllujeh (also Romanized as Qūzllūjeh; also known as Shīrīn Bolāgh) is a village in Mehranrud-e Markazi Rural District, in the Central District of Bostanabad County, East Azerbaijan Province, Iran. At the 2006 census, its population was 489, in 85 families.

References 

Populated places in Bostanabad County